Marder III was the name for a series of World War II German tank destroyers. They mounted either the modified ex-Soviet 76.2 mm F-22 Model 1936 divisional field gun, or the German 7.5 cm PaK 40, in an open-topped fighting compartment on top of the chassis of the Czechoslovakian Panzer 38(t). They offered little protection to the crew, but added significant firepower compared to contemporary German tanks. They were in production from 1942 to 1944, and served on all fronts until the end of the war, along with the similar Marder II. The German word Marder means "marten" in English.

History
In the early stages of Operation Barbarossa, the Wehrmacht felt the need for a more mobile and more powerful anti-tank solution than the existing towed anti-tank guns, such as the 3.7 cm Pak 36, or self-propelled tank destroyers, such as the Panzerjäger I (mounted with the 4.7 cm PaK (t)). This need became urgent in 1942, when anti-tank shells fired from said anti-tank guns failed to penetrate the armor of new Soviet tanks, such as the T-34 and KV-1.

As an interim solution, it was decided to use captured French vehicles, such as the Lorraine (Marder I), obsolete tanks in surplus, such as the German Panzer II (Marder II), and Czech-supplied Panzer 38(t) (Marder III) as the base for the production of makeshift tank destroyers. The result was the Marder series, which were armed with either captured Soviet 76.2mm F-22 Model 1936 divisional field guns, or German 7.5 cm PaK 40 anti-tank guns mounted in later versions. Due to weight, space, and time constraints, the Marder series had relatively thin armor when compared with other armored vehicles of the era. This thin upper armor formed a gunshield, only protecting the crew from shrapnel and small arms fire on the front and sides. All Marder series had open tops—although some were issued with canvas tops to protect the crew from the elements. In this regard, the Marder was more of a gun carriage than a proper Panzerjäger that could exchange fire with enemy tanks.

Development

Marder III, Sd.Kfz. 139 
While the Panzer 38(t) had largely become obsolete as a tank in early 1942, it was still an excellent and plentiful platform for adaptation into a tank destroyer, among other roles. Since the Soviet 76.2 mm field gun was captured in large quantities, the decision was made to mate this gun to the Panzer 38(t).

To do so, the mass production of the Panzer 38(t) Ausf. G was halted, and a modified superstructure was bolted onto the standard tank chassis in lieu of a gun turret. This upper structure mounted the gun and an extended gun shield, giving only limited protection for the commander, gunner, and the loader. Armor protection overall ranged from 10 to 50 mm, with no armor at all above and behind the gun compartment, which the crew occupied. It had a higher silhouette than the original Panzer 38(t), which made it more vulnerable to enemy fire.

In German service, the Soviet gun was redesignated 7.62 cm PaK 36(r), and rechambered for the more powerful German PaK 40 cartridge. Thirty rounds of ammunition were stored inside the vehicle. Apart from the main gun, there was a 7.92 mm machine gun mounted in the hull.

This tank destroyer was put into production as the Panzerjäger 38(t) für 7.62 cm PaK 36(r), Sd.Kfz. 139. A total of 344 vehicles were built in three series from April to November 1942. Chassis numbers were 1360–1479, 1527–1600, and 1601–1750.

Marder III Ausf. H, Sd.Kfz. 138
This next variant of the Marder III fielded the standard 7.5 cm PaK 40 German anti-tank gun on a slightly modified Panzer 38(t) Ausf. H chassis. This chassis still had the engine in the rear of the vehicle, but, unlike the previous model, this vehicle utilized the fighting compartment of the Panzer 38 in the center. This allowed the crew to stay low in the center of the vehicle, lowering their exposure to small arms fire and shell fragments. However, because of the rear-mounted engine, there was only enough room for two men to stand in the center. Large side armor gave additional protection for the crew. Despite this, the thin horseshoe-shaped armor only protected the front and sides; the rear and the top were exposed. Thirty-eight rounds of ammunition for the gun were carried. As with the Sd.Kfz.139, this vehicle also carried a Czech-manufactured 7.92 mm machine gun in the hull.

The full name of the Ausf. H was the 7.5 cm PaK 40/3 auf Panzerkampfwagen 38(t) Ausf. H, Sd.Kfz. 138. A total of 275 vehicles were built in two series from November 1942 to April 1943. An additional 175 vehicles were converted from Panzer 38(t)'s in 1943. Chassis numbers of new vehicles were 1751–2075 and 2121–2147 (overlapping with simultaneous Grille production).

Marder III Ausf. M, Sd.Kfz. 138
The last Marder III variant was based on the Geschützwagen 38(t) Ausf. M, a purpose-designed vehicle for self-propelled gun use, again armed with the 75 mm PaK 40 anti-tank gun. Ausf. M was the final variant of the Marder series, and was a significant improvement over previous models, with its lower silhouette, sloped armor, and much more functional fighting compartment. In this variant, the engine was moved from the rear to the middle between driver and the rest of the crew. Because there was no engine in the rear, the gun and the crew did not have to sit on top of the engine deck as in previous models. The fighting compartment could be lowered down to the bottom floor level where the engine used to be, which decreased crew exposure and visibility. Unlike the previous two Marder III variants, the fighting compartment was closed at the rear, protecting the crew up to their midsection. It stayed open-topped. The machine gun port at the front was eliminated in the Ausf. M in favor of an MG 34 or MG 42 carried by the crew. In the previous two models, the commander served as a gunner. However, in the Ausf. M, the radio man moved to the rear, with the commander and gunner, to serve as a loader. Only 27 rounds of 7.5 cm ammunition were carried, but combat effectiveness increased because the vehicle commander was freed from manning the gun.

The full name of the Ausf. M was Panzerjäger 38(t) mit 7.5 cm PaK 40/3 Ausf. M, Sd.Kfz. 138 . It was the variant that was produced in the largest numbers, with 942 vehicles built in two series from May 1943 to May 1944. Chassis numbers were 2166–2600 and 2601–3600 (overlapping with simultaneous Grille and Flakpanzer 38(t) production).

Combat history

The various Marder III’s fought on all European fronts and in North Africa, with the Sd. Kfz. 139 being used mainly at the Eastern Front, though some also fought in Tunisia. In February 1945, some 350 Ausf. M were still in service.

The Marder III’s were used by the Panzerjäger Abteilungen of the Panzer divisions of both the Heer and the Waffen SS, as well as several Luftwaffe units, such as the Hermann Göring division.

The Marder III’s were mechanically reliable, as with all vehicles based on the Czechoslovak LT-38 chassis. Their firepower was sufficient to destroy the majority of Soviet tanks on the battlefield at combat range.

The Marder III's weaknesses were mainly related to survivability. The combination of a high silhouette and open-top armor protection made them vulnerable to indirect artillery fire. The armor was also quite thin, making them highly vulnerable to enemy tanks, and to close-range machine gun fire.

The Marders were not assault vehicles or tank substitutes; the open top meant that operations in urban areas or other close-combat situations were very risky. They were best employed in defensive or overwatch roles. Despite their mobility, they did not replace the towed antitank guns.

In March 1942, before the Marder III appeared, Germany had already started production of the StuG III assault gun, which had comparable anti-tank capability (StuG III Ausf. F and later variants). These were fully armored vehicles, with the fighting compartment fully enclosed within an armored casemate, built in much greater numbers than the vulnerable Marder III. Among the many German casemated tank destroyers, one based on the Panzer 38(t) chassis was built in numbers from 1944: the Jagdpanzer 38(t). The weakly-armored Marder series were phased out of production in favor of the Jagdpanzer 38(t), but Marder series vehicles served until the end of the conflict.

Slovak National Uprising 
In June 1944, the army of the Slovak Republic received 18 Marder III Ausf. H. Four of them saw combat during the Slovak National Uprising. Two vehicles were used by the partisan brigade Čapajev. One of them was destroyed between the towns Vranov nad Topľou and Prešov. The second Marder was used in heavy fights near Hermanovce nad Topľou. Its commander, Rajták, suffered a gunshot wound, and the vehicle was subsequently abandoned.

The remaining two Marders were used by the Slovak insurgent army near Strečno, and they played an important role in the Battle of Strečno Gorge. One of the Marders, under the command of Private Matej Buc, destroyed three German tanks and two anti-tank guns. During the German assault on 3 September, Commander Matej Buc and loader Štefan Kováč, who were sitting in an open hull, were shot. However, the driver, František Smolnický, survived and escaped from the battlefield with the vehicle. It was repaired and reused in battle, but on 8 and 9 September, both Marders were destroyed in battle—one near Vrútky, and other one near Priekopa.

See also

Comparable vehicles
 German Marder I and II
 Italian Semovente da 75/34
 Romanian TACAM T-60 and TACAM R-2
 Soviet SU-76 and ZiS-30
 Spanish Verdeja 75 mm

References

Bibliography

External links
 Achtung Panzer!
 Marder III 
 OnWar (Marder III, Sd.Kfz.139, https://www.onwar.com/weapons/afv/data/tfmarder3m.htm (Marder III, Ausf.M, Sd.Kfz.138]
 World War II vehicles
 Captured German vehicles - A PDF file presenting the German vehicles based on captured and modified foreign equipment (PzKpfw. 35(t), PzKpfw 38(t), 10.5 cm leFH 18(Sf) auf Geschützwagen, Marder I, Panzerjäger I, Marder III, Grille, Munitionspanzer 38(t)) still existing in the world

World War II tank destroyers of Germany
Military vehicles introduced from 1940 to 1944